The 9th Internationales AdV Avusrennen was a Formula Two motor race held on 12 July 1953 at the AVUS circuit. The race was run over 25 laps of the circuit, and was won by Belgian driver Jacques Swaters in a Ferrari 500. Hans Klenk in a Veritas Meteor finished second and Theo Helfrich in another Veritas was third and set fastest lap.

Results

References

Avusrennen
Avusrennen
Avusrennen